Cochran is an unincorporated community in Austin County, in the U.S. state of Texas. According to the Handbook of Texas, its population was 116 in 2000. It is located within the Greater Houston metropolitan area.

History
The area of Austin County on the west bank of the Brazos River was first settled in the 1820s, but the Cochran community itself was not founded until around 1850. It was named for James Cochran, who was given a land grant near the location where Cochran currently stands today. A gin was established by William Lange and a general store was established by LT Henton when the community first began to be settled. A post office was established at Cochran in 1884 and remained in operation until 1908. It received its mail service from nearby Bellville soon after. A chapter of the Junior Red Cross was organized in 1918. It had four businesses and 25 residents in 1933. It went up to 40 in 1952 but had only two businesses. Oilfields were also developed near the community in the 1960s, with the population booming to 440 by 1966. Its population dropped sharply to 116 from 1972 through 2000.

Geography

Education
Cochran had its own school in 1918. Today, the community is served by the Bellville Independent School District.

References

Unincorporated communities in Austin County, Texas
Unincorporated communities in Texas